Kushki Kikanlu (also Romanized as Kūshkī Kīkānlū; also known as Kūshkī Līkānlū) is a village in Atrak Rural District, Maneh District, Maneh and Samalqan County, North Khorasan Province, Iran. At the 2006 census, its population was 256, in 79 families.

References 

Populated places in Maneh and Samalqan County